is a railway station on the Minobu Line of Central Japan Railway Company (JR Central) located in the town of Minobu, Minamikoma District, Yamanashi Prefecture, Japan.

Lines
Minobu Station is served by the Minobu Line and is located 43.5 kilometers from the southern terminus of the line at Fuji Station.

Layout
Minobu Station has one side platform land one island platform connected by a level crossing. The station is staffed.

Platform

Adjacent stations

History
Minobu Station was opened on May 18, 1920 as the terminal station on the original Fuji-Minobu Line. The line was extended to Ichikawa-Daimon Station in December 1927, and came under control of the Japanese Government Railways on May 1, 1941. The JGR became the JNR (Japan National Railway) after World War II. A new station building was completed in June 1980. Along with the division and privatization of JNR on April 1, 1987, the station came under the control and operation of the Central Japan Railway Company.

Surrounding area
 Fuji River
Minobu High School
Minobu Junior High School

See also
 List of railway stations in Japan

External links

 Minobu Line station information 

Railway stations in Japan opened in 1920
Railway stations in Yamanashi Prefecture
Minobu Line
Minobu, Yamanashi